French Underground may refer to the
French Resistance during World War II
French crime (see French Connection, Unione Corse, etc.)